The 7.35×51mm Carcano is a rifle cartridge that was the main small arms ammunition used by the Italian military during World War II. 

It was designed during the 1930s to replace the 6.5×52mm Carcano used by the Italian military. Unlike the 6.5 mmm, the 7.35 mm cartridge featured a Spitzer-style bullet to minimize air resistance in flight.

Description
After reports of inadequate performance of the 6.5×52mm Mannlicher–Carcano at both short and long ranges during the campaigns in Italian North Africa (1924–1934) and the Second Italo-Abyssinian War (1935/36), the Italian army introduced a new short rifle in 1938, the Modello 1938, together with a new cartridge in 7.35×51mm caliber. In addition to the slightly larger caliber, Italian ordnance designers introduced a spitzer-type bullet for the new cartridge, with the tip filled with aluminum to produce an unstable (tumbling) projectile upon impact with soft tissue (a design most likely copied from the .303 British Mk VII bullet). Although the intention was to create a more powerful and precise rifle cartridge, the decision to adopt a lighter bullet than in the 6.5 mm Carcano, and various design problems of the 91/38 rifle, did not permit the cartridge to achieve the intended success.

See also
 Table of handgun and rifle cartridges

Notes

Pistol and rifle cartridges
Military cartridges